Zhao Boshi (born June 5, 1994) is a Chinese kickboxer, currently competing in the -60 kg division of Wu Lin Feng. Between November 2021 and April 2022, Combat Press ranked him as a top ten bantamweight kickboxer in the world.

Kickboxing career
Boshi made his professional debut against Yusuke Kojima at Wu Lin Feng 2018: World Championship Yichun on May 19, 2018. He won the fight by a second-round knockout. Boshi next faced Michel Olensky at Wu Lin Feng 2018: China vs Netherlands & Russia on June 16, 2018. He won the fight by unanimous decision.

Boshi made three appearances with ONE Championship soon after his debut, competing in the ONE Hero Series. He would notch two victories with the promotion, unanimous decision wins against Liu Hai Yang at ONE Hero Series August on August 26, 2019 and Huang Shuailu at ONE Hero Series December on December 16, 2019, while suffering one loss at the hands of Zhang Tao at ONE Hero Series November on November 18, 2019.

Boshi faced Spyro Besiri at Wu Lin Feng 2019: WLF in Manila on October 23, 2019. He won the fight by technical knockout, after Besiri injured his right hand midway through the final round.

Boshi took part in the 2020 Wu Lin Feng -60 kg Championship Tournament, which was held on November 14, 2020. Although he was able to beat Zhao Jiangfeng by unanimous decision in the quarterfinals of the one-day tournament, he himself lost the semifinal bout against the eventual tournament winner Zhang Lanpei by unanimous decision.

Boshi faced Zhang Lanpei at Wu Lin Feng 2021: World Contender League 1st Stage on March 27, 2021, in his first fight of the year. He won the fight by unanimous decision. Boshi next faced Yang Hua at Wu Lin Feng 2021: World Contender League 4th Stage on May 29, 2021. He won the fight by unanimous decision. The pair fought a rematch at Wu Lin Feng 2021: WLF in Tangshan on September 25, 2021. Boshi prevailed once again, winning the fight by unanimous decision.

Fight record

|-  style="background:#fbb"
| 2022-03-26 || Loss ||align=left| Yang Ming ||  Wu Lin Feng 528, 60kg 4-man Tournament Semi Final || Tangshan, China || Decision (Unanimous) || 3 ||3:00
|-  style="background:#cfc"
| 2021-09-25 ||Win ||align=left| Yang Hua ||  Wu Lin Feng 2021: WLF in Tangshan || Tangshan, China || Decision (Unanimous)  || 3 || 3:00
|-  style="background:#cfc"
| 2021-05-29 ||Win ||align=left| Yang Hua ||  Wu Lin Feng 2021: World Contender League 4th Stage || Zhengzhou, China || Decision (Unanimous)  || 3 || 3:00
|-  style="background:#cfc"
| 2021-03-27 ||Win ||align=left| Zhang Lanpei ||  Wu Lin Feng 2021: World Contender League 1st Stage || Zhengzhou, China || Decision (Unanimous)  || 3 || 3:00
|-  style="background:#cfc"
| 2020-12-22||Win ||align=left| Li Ning ||  Wu Lin Feng 2020: Women's 52kg Championship Tournament || Zhengzhou, China || KO  ||  ||
|-  style="background:#fbb"
| 2020-11-14 || Loss ||align=left| Zhang Lanpei ||  Wu Lin Feng 2020: China 60kg & 63kg Championship Tournament, Tournament Semifinal || Zhengzhou, China || KO (Low Kick) || 1 ||
|-  style="background:#cfc"
| 2020-11-14 ||Win ||align=left| Zhao Jiangfeng ||  Wu Lin Feng 2020: China 60kg & 63kg Championship Tournament, Tournament Quarterfinal || Zhengzhou, China || Decision (Unanimous) || 3 || 3:00
|-  style="background:#cfc"
| 2020-09-23 ||Win ||align=left| Feng Tienhao ||  Wu Lin Feng 2020: King's Super Cup 5th Group Stage || Zhengzhou, China || Decision (Unanimous) || 3 || 3:00
|-  style="background:#cfc"
| 2020-08-03 ||Win ||align=left| Zhao Jiangfeng ||  Wu Lin Feng 2020: King's Super Cup 4th Group Stage || Zhengzhou, China || Decision  || 3 || 3:00
|-  style="background:#cfc"
| 2020-07-05 ||Win ||align=left| Jin Hu || Wu Lin Feng 2020: King's Super Cup 3rd Group Stage || Zhengzhou, China || Decision  || 3 || 3:00
|-  style="background:#fbb"
| 2020-06-13 || Loss ||align=left| Li Yuankun || Wu Lin Feng 2020: King's Super Cup 2nd Group Stage || Zhengzhou, China || Ext.R ecision (Decision) || 4 || 3:00
|-  style="background:#cfc"
| 2020-05-15 ||Win ||align=left| Zhang Lanpei || Wu Lin Feng 2020: King's Super Cup 1st Group Stage || Zhengzhou, China || Decision (Unanimous) || 3 || 3:00
|-  style="background:#cfc"
| 2019-12-16 ||Win ||align=left| Huang Shuailu || ONE Hero Series December || Beijing, China || Decision (Unanimous) || 3 || 3:00
|-  style="background:#fbb"
| 2019-11-18 || Loss ||align=left| Zhang Tao || ONE Hero Series November || Beijing, China || Decision (Unanimous) || 3 || 3:00
|-  style="background:#cfc"
| 2019-10-23 ||Win ||align=left| Spyro Besiri || Wu Lin Feng 2019: WLF in Manila || Manila, Philippines || TKO (Hand injury) || 3 || 1:14
|-  style="background:#cfc"
| 2019-08-26 ||Win ||align=left| Liu Hai Yang || ONE Hero Series August || Manila, Philippines || Decision (Unanimous) || 3 || 3:00
|-  style="background:#cfc"
| 2019-04-27 ||Win ||align=left| Faray Randrianarivo || Wu Lin Feng 2019: WLF -63kg Championship World Tournament || Zhuhai, China || Decision || 3 || 3:00
|-  style="background:#cfc"
| 2018-10-22 ||Win ||align=left| Sergey || TOPKING Muay Thai Star Tournament|| Qingzhou, China || Decision (Unanimous) || 3 || 3:00
|-  style="background:#cfc"
| 2018-06-16 ||Win ||align=left| Michel Olensky || Wu Lin Feng 2018: China vs Netherlands & Russia || Shenyang, China || Decision (Unanimous) || 3 || 3:00
|-  style="background:#cfc"
| 2018-05-19 ||Win ||align=left| Yusuke Kojima || Wu Lin Feng 2018: World Championship Yichun || Yichun, Jiangxi, China || KO (Knee) || 2 || 
|-
| colspan=9 | Legend:

See also
 List of male kickboxers

References

Living people
1994 births
Chinese male kickboxers
People from Zhoukou
Sportspeople from Henan